"Step Back" is a song recorded by American country music artist Ronnie McDowell.  It was released in September 1982 as the second single from the album Love to Burn.  The song reached #7 on the Billboard Hot Country Singles & Tracks chart.  The song was written by Craig Morris.

Chart performance

References

1982 singles
1982 songs
Ronnie McDowell songs
Song recordings produced by Buddy Killen
Epic Records singles